Appleton Milo Harmon (May 29, 1820 – February 27, 1877) was an early member of the Church of Jesus Christ of Latter-day Saints and a leading pioneer of the emigration to Salt Lake City and the settlement of Utah Territory.  Harmon was born in Conneaut, Pennsylvania, the son of Jesse Pierce Harmon and Annie Barnes, he married Elmeda Stringham in 1846.  He was devoted to his religion and was an industrious and multi-talented builder who constructed sawmills, a cotton factory, pony express roads, furniture, wagons, and worked as a farmer, blacksmith, policeman and other trades.

Harmon joined the Church of Jesus Christ of Latter-day Saints in 1842 in Nauvoo Illinois.  Because of the persecution of the members of the church, in February 1846, Harmon and his recently married wife loaded their possessions into a wagon and crossed the frozen Mississippi river for Iowa, and then traveled on to Winter Quarters near Florence Nebraska.  These were especially hard times and, because of the harsh conditions, his mother, his sister and his first born child died and they are buried at Winter Quarters.  In the spring of 1847 Harmon was chosen to be a leader in Brigham Young's vanguard company for the trek to the west. During the 1847 trek, Harmon is often remembered for building an early version of the modern odometer using the conceptual designs of William Clayton and Orson Pratt. It was placed on the wagon of Heber C. Kimball and it improved the efficiency and accuracy of logging the daily mileage.  The use of this "Roadometer" was the key to the accuracy of the emigrant's guide later published by Clayton that was the essential to subsequent travelers of the Mormon trail.

Later in the 1847 trek, Harmon was left with 9 other men to construct and operate a ferry across the North Platte river located near present-day Casper, Wyoming.  After settling in Salt Lake City in 1848 he prospered, living in downtown Salt lake city, building one of the first sawmills and farming near the present location of Sugar House Park.  Harmon kept detailed journals of his trek west and his 1850-1853 mission to England that have been published. On the trail heading east for his missionary service in 1850, he saw throngs of gold miners heading west in the second year of the California gold rush, and he was an eye-witness to, and a survivor of, the tragic cholera epidemic that decimated the participants. In 1851 he visited the famous Crystal Palace Exposition in London.  He had success on his mission and led a company of about 300 Latter-day Saints from England to Salt Lake City on his return in 1853. In 1862 he was called to settle southern Utah.  After experiencing floods of the Virgin river in Grafton, he settled in Toquerville where he built a lumbermill, farmed and made furniture.  In 1865 Brigham Young called him to oversee the design, construction and equipping of a factory for producing cotton fabric. Cotton and Woolen fabrics were produced until 1904, although interest in cotton diminished after the civil war and the coming of the railroad.  The building that housed the factory, located in Washington near St. George Utah, still stands. In 1870 Harmon moved to Holden, Utah, where he built another lumbermill. He and Elmeda had 12 children.

References

Bibliography
 Anderson, Maybelle Harmon. The Journals of Appleton Milo Harmon (Arthur H. Clark Company, Glendale, 1946), ASIN: B000EIPPVW

External links 
  Appleton Milo Harmon
  Nauvoo Research Group
  History of the Odometer
 Pioneer Company Sources
 

1820 births
1877 deaths
19th-century Mormon missionaries
American diarists
19th-century American inventors
American Latter Day Saint writers
American Mormon missionaries in England
Converts to Mormonism
Historians of the Latter Day Saint movement
Mormon pioneers
Latter Day Saints from Pennsylvania
Latter Day Saints from Utah
19th-century diarists